Subdivisions of Slovenia:

 Cadastral community
 Municipalities of Slovenia
 NUTS of Slovenia
 Statistical regions of Slovenia
 ISO 3166-2:SI
 Six telephone areas: see Telephone numbers in Slovenia

 
Slovenia